Placulumab is a human monoclonal antibody designed for the treatment of inflammatory diseases.

This drug was developed by Teva Pharmaceutical Industries, Inc. As of 2012, development of placulumab has been discontinued.

References 

Monoclonal antibodies